Dunavant is an unincorporated community in Jefferson County, Kansas, United States.

History
A post office was opened in Dunavant in 1888, and remained in operation until it was discontinued in 1932.

In 1910, Dunavant's population was 85 people. In 1912, Dunavant had a money order Post Office and a telegraph office, and was on a branch of the Missouri Pacific Railroad.

Battle of Hickory Point

The Battle of Hickory Point proceeded on September 13 and 14, 1856. On September 13, 1856, James H. Lane, leader of Free-State men in Kansas, besieged a group of Border Ruffians in the log buildings near Dunavant at Hickory Point (also known as Stony Point), a proslavery settlement on the Ft. Leavenworth-Ft. Riley military road. Prior, this group of proslavery men led by Capt. H. A. Lowe had attacked Valley Falls, then called Grasshopper Falls. Among this band of the Border Ruffians were around 40 South Carolinians.

With a small force of jayhawkers Lane attacked but was repulsed. Then Lane sent to Lawrence for artillery to drive the Border Ruffians out. Reinforcements led by Col. James A. Harvey arrived the next day, on September 14, 1856, and the skirmish ended with 4 Proslavery men wounded, 1 killed, and 5 Free-State men injured. Around 100 Free-Staters were detained by U.S. troops afterwards since the skirmish occurred after declaration issued by Territorial Governor John W. Geary directing to cease all hostilities in the Kansas Territory. Jayhawkers claimed self-defense and were let go.

A Kansas Historical Marker for the Battle of Hickory Point stands a half mile away, on today's U.S. Route 59.

Farm where John Steuart Curry was born

Also nearby, just 1/4 mi. from the Battle of Hickory Point marker, is the farm on which painter John Steuart Curry was born. The farmhouse has been moved to Oskaloosa and there are plans to turn it into a museum. 

Later in life, John Steuart Curry would become known for his painting of abolitionist John Brown at the Kansas State Capitol, and also for his painting Law vs. Mob Rule at the Department of Justice in Washington, DC, in which a judge in black robes protects a man from a lynch mob.

Geography

Notable people
 John Stuart Curry (1897–1946), painter

References

Further reading

 The First Day's Battle at Hickory Point. From the Diary and Reminiscenses [sic of Samuel James Reader, Kansas historical Society.

External links
 Plum Grove Cemetery, Dunavant, Kansas
 Historical marker for Battle of Hickory Point, located 1/4 mil E of John Steuart Curry's birthplace, on U.S. Route 59
 Photographs of Dunevant, Kansas, Panoramio
 Battle of Hickory Point reenactment , Jefferson News
 Jefferson County maps: Current, Historic, KDOT

Unincorporated communities in Kansas
Unincorporated communities in Jefferson County, Kansas